The stonner kebab is a pork sausage wrapped in strips of doner meat, coated in two layers of batter, and then deep fried. It is served on a bed of chips. The kebab weighs . The dish is available in Ruby Chip Shop in Glasgow. The name stonner is derived from a combination of "sausage" and "donner", and is the Glaswegian slang word for an erection.

See also 
List of kebabs

References

Bibliography 

 
 
 

British sausages